= Persian Gulf Veterans National Medal =

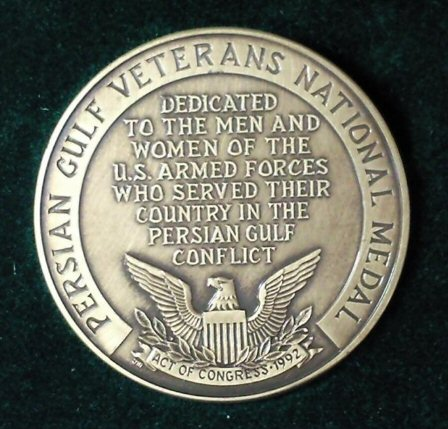
- Persian Gulf Veterans National Medal of United States of America (1995 to 1997) (lit. 6.25 Incident Participation Medal)
- Type: Service medal
- Awarded for: Military service during periods of Persian Gulf War
- Presented by: United States of America
- Eligibility: Member of the United States Armed Forces during qualifying periods of the Persian Gulf War
- Campaigns: Persian Gulf War, Iraq-Kuwait War
- Status: Inactive
- First award: 1995
- Final award: 1997

Highlights
- Total awarded posthumously: yes

The Persian Gulf Veterans National Medal is an honorific military medal authorized by United States Congress presented to members of the U.S. Armed Forces who served in a combat zone during the Persian Gulf War.

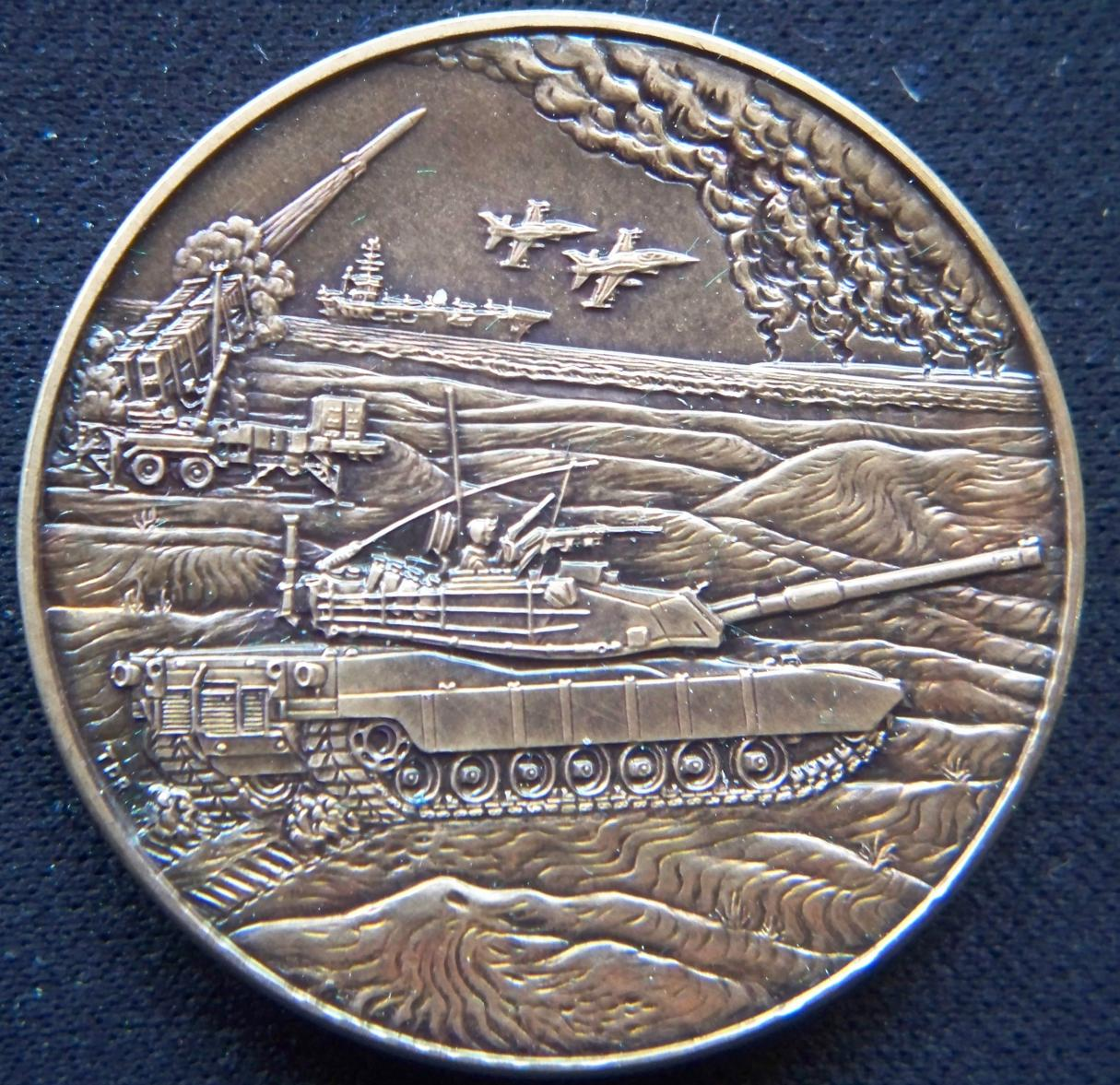
PersianGulfMedal

== See also ==
- U.S. war on Iraq
- Iraq-Kuwait War
